Luigi Albertelli (21 June 1934 – 19 February 2021) was an Italian songwriter and television author.

Biography
Born in Tortona, Alessandria, Albertelli debuted as a lyricist in the second half of the 1960s and got his first success in 1969 with the song "Zingara", which won the nineteenth edition of the Sanremo Music Festival and was a number 1 hit. 

Characterized by an elegant and refined style,   his collaborations include Mina, Milva, Drupi, Mia Martini, Caterina Caselli, Dik Dik, Fiordaliso. In 1987 his song "La notte dei pensieri" won the Newcomers competition at the 37th Sanremo Music Festival.

He wrote the Italian theme songs of various anime, such as Goldrake and Captain Harlock.

References

External links 
 
   

 

1934 births
2021 deaths
Italian lyricists
People from Tortona